Sound & Color is the second and final studio album by American band Alabama Shakes. It was released on April 17, 2015 via ATO Records.

Sound & Color debuted at number one on the Billboard 200 in the U.S., giving the band their first chart-topper; globally, the album hit the top ten in Australia, the Netherlands, Switzerland and the United Kingdom. The album was also a critical success and was nominated six Grammy Awards, winning four for Best Alternative Music Album, Best Engineered Album, Non-Classical, as well as Best Rock Performance and Best Rock Song for "Don't Wanna Fight". It spawned four singles; "Don't Wanna Fight" was the most successful, peaking at number two on Billboard Adult Alternative Songs chart.

Background
Alabama Shakes began recording their second album in late 2013. The group listened to anything and everything for influence, without regard for its public reception in the end. They spent over a year in the studio, with no clear end-goal, as they had not written any new songs due to their exhaustive touring schedule. Sound & Color is steeped in several different genres, touching on shoegaze to bands such as MC5.

In promotion of Sound & Color, the group appeared on Saturday Night Live on February 28, 2015; they performed the singles "Gimme All Your Love" and "Don't Wanna Fight".

The title song, "Sound & Color", was used in the final episode of the first season of Mr. Robot.

In 2017, the song "This Feeling" was used in the first season of the HBO miniseries Big Little Lies, and in 2019, it was used in the end scene of the final episode of the British TV show Fleabag. The song "Sound & Color" was used in the end credits of the 2019 film Waves, directed by Trey Edward Shults and produced by A24. "Don't Wanna Fight" was used in the 2019 film Just Mercy.

A deluxe edition of the album was released on October 29, 2021, featuring three B-sides and  four live recordings. The live recording of "Future People" was released as a promotional single on September 29, 2021.

Composition
"A genuine Americana love letter", Sound & Color is rooted in Southern rock and soul music. It has also been noted for making roots rock "a surprise again". Yet despite being rooted in these genres, Sound & Color includes some of the quartet's most eclectic and experimental songs to date. It features sounds of country, blues, funk, garage punk, punk rock, swamp rock, and talking blues. Its songs have been compared to musicians like Erykah Badu and Curtis Mayfield and bands like MC5 and the Strokes.

The "engrossing" "Guess Who" explores jazz sounds. The "ballistic" "The Greatest" takes on cowpunk like that of the Meat Puppets, as well as hardcore punk, new wave, proto-punk, and "no-frills" rock and roll. A "fun little bash" is made out of the fusion of grunge and funk on "Shoegaze". Both songs have also been noted as garage rock.

Sound & Color digs its heels into more psychedelia-based stylings, from the "slow-burning" space rock of "Dunes" to the "celestial" psychedelic funk of "Future People". "Gemini", the record's longest song, changes between "smooth R&B and stoner-desert rock" while journeying into "zero-gravity" funk.

Commercial performance
The album debuted atop the US Billboard 200 chart, earning 97,000 album-equivalent units (91,000 copies of traditional album sales) in its first week, in the week ending April 26, 2015, making it the band's first number one album.  The album has sold  306,000 copies in the US as of December 2015.

Critical reception

Upon its release, Sound & Color received positive reviews. At the review aggregator Metacritic, the album currently holds a score of 80 based on 30 critics, indicating "generally favorable reviews". Writing for Exclaim!, Andrea Warner called the record a "deliberately weird record, but authentically weird; it's chaotic yet cohesive, full of sound, colour and unshakable vision." Barry Nicholson of NME compared it favorably to the band's first album, writing, "whereas their debut was cast in sepia hues and downhome earthiness, its follow-up is a more kaleidoscopic affair."

Accolades
Sound & Color garnered six nominations at the 58th Annual Grammy Awards; it was nominated for the Album of the Year, marking the group's first nomination in the category. The album was also nominated for Grammy Award for Producer of the Year, Non-Classical (Blake Mills), and won Best Alternative Music Album, Best Engineered Album, Non-Classical (Shawn Everett and Bob Ludwig). "Don't Wanna Fight" won for Best Rock Performance and Best Rock Song.

Semester-end lists

Year-end lists

* denotes an unordered list

Decade-end lists

Track listing

Personnel
Credits adapted from Sound & Color liner notes.

Alabama Shakes
 Brittany Howard − vocals , guitar , vibraphone , percussion , keyboards ; string arrangement 
 Heath Fogg − guitar , percussion 
 Zac Cockrell − bass , percussion 
 Steve Johnson − drums , percussion 

Additional musicians
 Ben Tanner − keyboards , vibraphone , percussion 
 Paul Horton − keyboards 
 Rob Moose − string arrangements 

Production
 Alabama Shakes − production
 Blake Mills − production, percussion , guitar , vibraphone 
 Bob Ludwig − mastering
 Shawn Everett − mixing, engineering

Charts

Weekly charts

Year-end charts

Certifications

References

External links
 
 

2015 albums
Alabama Shakes albums
ATO Records albums
Grammy Award for Best Alternative Music Album
Grammy Award for Best Engineered Album, Non-Classical
MapleMusic Recordings albums
Rough Trade Records albums
Albums produced by Blake Mills